PX-1 (also known as 5F-APP-PICA and SRF-30) is an indole-based synthetic cannabinoid that has been sold online as a designer drug.

Legality
Sweden's public health agency suggested classifying PX-1 as hazardous substance on November 10, 2014.

PX-1 is listed in the Fifth Schedule of the Misuse of Drugs Act (MDA) and therefore illegal in Singapore as of May 2015.

See also 

 5F-AB-PINACA
 5F-ADB
 5F-AMB
 5F-APINACA
 AB-FUBINACA
 AB-CHFUPYCA
 AB-CHMINACA
 AB-PINACA
 ADB-CHMINACA
 ADB-FUBINACA
 ADB-PINACA
 ADBICA
 APICA
 APINACA
 MDMB-CHMICA
 PX-2
 PX-3

References 

Indoles
Cannabinoids
Designer drugs
Indolecarboxamides
Organofluorides